The  was a Japanese railway line of Noto Railway in Ishikawa Prefecture, between Anamizu Station in Anamizu, Hōsu District and Takojima Station in Suzu. This railway line closed on April 1, 2005.

Line data 
 Length: 61 km
 Rail gauge: 
 Number of stations: 30
 Double Track: None (single track)
 Electrified Section: None (non electrified)

History 
The first 22.9-km section of the Noto Line of Japanese National Railways (JNR) between Anamizu Station and Ukawa Station opened on June 15, 1959.
It was extended 9.9 km to Ushitsu Station on April 17, 1960, 13.8 km to Matsunami Station on October 1, 1963 and 14.5 km to Takojima Station on September 21, 1964 completing the line of 61.1 km in total, and featuring 49 tunnels in that distance.

Following the privatization of JNR on April 1, 1987, the line was operated by West Japan Railway Company until the company transferred the operation of the line to Noto Railway on March 25, 1988.

The line was closed on April 1, 2005.

Stations

References 

Railway lines in Japan
Rail transport in Ishikawa Prefecture
Railway lines opened in 1959
Defunct railroads
Railway lines closed in 2005
1067 mm gauge railways in Japan
Japanese third-sector railway lines